Jo Yon-jun (born September 28, 1937) is a North Korean politician. Jo is a candidate member of the Politburo of the Workers' Party of Korea (WPK) and former first deputy in the Organization and Guidance Department (OGD) of the Central Committee of the WPK.

In 2016, in a round of sanctions targeted at human rights abuses in North Korea, he was placed under sanctions by the United States as the man who is responsible for the execution of defectors from the country.

References

North Korean politicians
People from South Hamgyong
1937 births
Living people
21st-century North Korean people
Alternate members of the 6th Politburo of the Workers' Party of Korea
Members of the 6th Central Committee of the Workers' Party of Korea